Consuelo Castillo de Sánchez Latour (February 7, 1924 in Chiquimula – July 11, 2015 in Guatemala City) was a French-Guatemalan writer, chronicler and journalist. She spoke fluent Spanish, English, French and Esperanto.

In December 1958, Castillo was listed as a candidate to "Woman of the Year" in the competition promoted by Prensa Libre. She was Vice-President of the "Asociación de Mujeres Periodistas y Escritoras de Guatemala" (Ampeg) for more than 30 years. Consuelo Sanchez also promoted the Esperanto language in Guatemala along with other intellectuals and teachers. She was president of the "Asociación Esperantista de Guatemala" as well as the "Unión de Mujeres Americanas" from 1959 to 1963.

It is believed that Castillo was a distant family member of Enrique Gómez Carrillo. She is considered a notable French Guatemalan.

References

1924 births
2015 deaths
Guatemalan women short story writers
Guatemalan short story writers
Guatemalan people of Spanish descent
Guatemalan people of French descent
21st-century Guatemalan women writers
French Esperantists
20th-century short story writers
21st-century short story writers
20th-century Guatemalan women writers